Jordan Arthur Tata (TAY-ta) (born September 20, 1981) is a retired major league pitcher. Tata made his major league debut on April 6, 2006 against the Texas Rangers in a 10-6 win. For college he attended Sam Houston State. Tata bats and throws right-handed.

While pitching for the Lakeland Tigers in 2005, Tata made the Florida State League All-Star team as a starting pitcher, and at the season's end he was named the league's Pitcher of the Year.

Tata picked up his first big league win on July 30, 2007 while pitching in place of the injured Kenny Rogers. The Tigers beat the Oakland Athletics by a score of 5-2. Tata struck out 5, walked 2 and allowed 6 hits and 2 earned runs. Todd Jones gave Tata the customary shaving cream-pie to the face during a post game interview. Jordan's second start at Comerica Park August 3 resulted in a 3-1 loss. Tata gave up all three runs in 5 innings pitched.

Tata spent the  baseball season pitching for the Lakeland Flying Tigers of the Florida State League and the Gulf Coast Tigers of the Rookie League.

After a rough spring, the Tigers released Tata on April 1, 2009.

Tata was signed by the Grand Prairie AirHogs on April 15, 2009.

The Grand Prairie AirHogs released Tata on July 1.

He is now a head coach of select baseball teams in Texas.

References

External links

1981 births
Living people
Sportspeople from Plano, Texas
Detroit Tigers players
Toledo Mud Hens players
Major League Baseball pitchers
Sam Houston Bearkats baseball players
Baseball players from Texas
Grand Prairie AirHogs players
Gulf Coast Tigers players
Gigantes del Cibao players
American expatriate baseball players in the Dominican Republic
Lakeland Flying Tigers players
Lakeland Tigers players
Oneonta Tigers players
Phoenix Desert Dogs players
West Michigan Whitecaps players